Trio is a chocolate bar sold in the United Kingdom consisting of a biscuit base topped with soft toffee cream, covered in thick milk chocolate. The Trio brand is owned by United Biscuits and sold under the McVitie's brand. Trio was previously manufactured by Jacob's who discontinued production in 2003, along with the Choc Trio variant which had a soft chocolate cream in place of the toffee cream, that was introduced in 1988. There had also been a strawberry variant, which had a soft strawberry cream in place of the standard toffee cream. The original toffee flavoured bar returned in March 2016 following a campaign on Facebook.

The brand was known in the 1980s for its distinctive television advertisements by animator Bob Godfrey in which a cartoon character Suzy sang along to the tune of Day-O (The Banana Boat Song): "Trio, Trio, I want a Trio and I want one now".

There was also an Irish edition of the bar during the late 1970s produced by Jacob's.

References

United Biscuits brands
British confectionery
Chocolate bars